Alexandru Karikaş (10 May 1931 – 14 April 2007) was a Romanian footballer who played for CA Câmpulung Moldovenesc, CCA București, Progresul Oradea and Progresul București between 1953 and 1964.

Honours

Club 
CCA București
Romanian League: 1953
Romanian Cup: 1955

Progresul Oradea
Romanian Cup: 1956

Progresul București
Romanian Cup: 1959–60

Notes

References

External links

1931 births
2007 deaths
Romanian footballers
Romania international footballers
Association football defenders
Liga I players
FC Steaua București players
CA Oradea players
FC Progresul București players
Sportspeople from Satu Mare